Hunzib may refer to:
 Hunzib people: An indigenous people of the Caucasus
 Hunzib language: Their language